The 1936 Dayton Flyers football team was an American football team that represented the University of Dayton as a member of the Buckeye Athletic Association during the 1936 college football season. In its 14th season under head coach Harry Baujan, the team compiled a 4–5 record.

Schedule

References

Dayton
Dayton Flyers football seasons
Dayton Flyers football